Lakeland South is a census-designated place (CDP) in King County, Washington, United States. The population was 11,574 at the 2010 census.

Based on per capita income, one of the more reliable measures of affluence, Lakeland South ranks 65th of 522 areas in the state of Washington to be ranked.

Geography
Lakeland South is located in southwestern King County at  (47.277262, -122.283839). It is bordered to the north and west by the city of Federal Way, to the northeast by Auburn, to the east by Algona and Pacific, and to the south by Milton and Edgewood. The boundary with Edgewood is the Pierce County line. Interstate 5 touches the northwest edge of the community, Washington State Route 18 runs along the northern edge, and State Route 167 runs just east of the eastern edge.

Water bodies in the community include Trout Lake, Fivemile Lake, Lake Killarney, and Lake Geneva.

Demographics

At the 2000 census, there were 11,436 people, 4,135 households and 3,163 families residing in the CDP. The population density was 2,113.2 per square mile (816.2/km2). There were 4,241 housing units at an average density of 783.7/sq mi (302.7/km2). The racial makeup of the CDP was 83.94% White, 3.69% African-American, 0.87% Native American, 6.09% Asian, 0.42% Pacific Islander, 1.15% from other races, and 3.83% from two or more races. Hispanic or Latino of any race were 3.33% of the population.

There were 4,135 households, of which 38.2% had children under the age of 18 living with them, 64.5% were married couples living together, 8.0% had a female householder with no husband present, and 23.5% were non-families. 17.4% of all households were made up of individuals, and 5.4% had someone living alone who was 65 years of age or older. The average household size was 2.76 and the average family size was 3.12.

27.6% of the population were under the age of 18, 6.8% from 18 to 24, 33.0% from 25 to 44, 23.5% from 45 to 64, and 9.1% who were 65 years of age or older. The median age was 36 years. For every 100 females there were 99.8 males. For every 100 females age 18 and over, there were 100.9 males.

The median household income was $62,529 and the median family income was $64,223. Males had a median income of $48,584 versus $34,398 for females. The per capita income for the CDP was $26,833. About 4.3% of families and 5.3% of the population were below the poverty line, including 7.0% of those under age 18 and 2.3% of those age 65 or over.

References

Census-designated places in King County, Washington